Campylomyces is a genus of wood-rotting fungi in the family Gloeophyllaceae. The genus, circumscribed by Karen K. Nakasone in 2004 to contain two species formerly assigned to Veluticeps, is characterized by producing small, thin, cup-shaped fruit bodies that grow in groups.

References

Gloeophyllales
Agaricomycetes genera